Rainer Hauck (born 16 January 1978) is a German footballer. He made his debut on the professional league level in the Bundesliga for 1. FC Kaiserslautern on 4 November 2000 when he started in a game against FC Schalke 04.

References

External links
 

1978 births
Living people
German footballers
Bundesliga players
1. FC Kaiserslautern players
1. FC Kaiserslautern II players
F91 Dudelange players
Wormatia Worms players
Association football defenders